Lebanese Ecuadorians are Ecuadorians who are descended from migrants from Lebanon. There are approximately 100,000 Lebanese people and their descendants living in Ecuador.

Migration history
Migration from Lebanon to Ecuador started as early as 1875. Early impoverished migrants tended to work as independent sidewalk vendors, rather than as wage workers in agriculture or others' businesses. Though they emigrated to escape Ottoman Turkish oppression, they were called "Turks" by Ecuadorians because they carried Ottoman passports. There were further waves of immigration in the first half of the 20th century; by 1930, there were 577 Lebanese immigrants and 489 of their descendants residing in the country, primarily at Quito and Guayaquil.

Demography
The number of Lebanese descendants in Ecuador is not too clear. A 1982 estimate from Lebanon's Ministry of Foreign Affairs stated 20,000, while another private estimate from 1986 put it as high as 97,500. They reside mostly in Quito and Guayaquil. They are predominantly of the Christian Catholic faith.

Notable people

People of Lebanese background are very well represented in business and politics of the country. Some of them have reached the presidency and vice-presidency of Ecuador. Their prominence in politics provoked some backlash, with one politician warning of the "Bedouinization" of Ecuador.

Julio Teodoro Salem was President for a short interim period in May 1944 before election of José María Velasco Ibarra. 
Abdalá Bucaram was elected President from August 10, 1996 to February 6, 1997. However he was highly unpopular and Parliament dismissed him because of "mental disability". He was accused also of embezzlement of public funds and replaced by Rosalía Arteaga. 
Yet a third President of the Republic was Jamil Mahuad. He served from August 10, 1998 to January 21, 2000 when he was forced to resign after a week of demonstrations by indigenous Ecuadorians and a military revolt led by Lucio Gutiérrez.
Alberto Dahik, a Finance Minister and member of the Ecuadoran. He was a running mate of Sixto Durán Ballén and upon victory in the elections, served Vice Presidency to Sixto Durán Ballén for period 1992 to 1995.
Jaime Nebot, was Mayor of Guayaquil from August 10, 2000 to May 14, 2019.

Notes

Bibliography

 
Ethnic groups in Ecuador
Lebanese diaspora in South America
Ecuador